Jaidatta Kshirsagar  is a leader of Shiv Sena from Beed district, Marathwada. He is a past Member of the Legislative Assembly of Maharashtra for Beed, and a former minister of Maharashtra.

Positions held
 1990: Elected to Maharashtra Legislative Assembly 
 1999: Elected to Maharashtra Legislative Assembly 
 2009: Elected to Maharashtra Legislative Assembly
 2009: Appointed as Minister of Public Works Department in Maharashtra Government
 2014: Re-Elected to Maharashtra Legislative Assembly
 2019: Minister of Employment Guarantee and Horticulture in Maharashtra State Government

See also
 Devendra Fadnavis ministry

References

External links
 The Shivsena

Indian National Congress politicians from Maharashtra
Nationalist Congress Party politicians from Maharashtra
People from Beed
Maharashtra MLAs 2009–2014
Maharashtra MLAs 2014–2019
Living people
Year of birth missing (living people)
Shiv Sena politicians